Garrett Kelleher is an Irish real estate developer and businessman with additional corporate interests in finance, film and education.

Early life and education

Kelleher was born in Dublin, Ireland. Educated at Belvedere College, Kelleher first went to the United States on a tennis scholarship. He then studied Mathematics at Trinity College Dublin.

Career
After completing his education, Kelleher returned to the US in 1985 owning and running a contracting and development business primarily involved in loft conversion in Chicago, employing more 120 people. He moved back to Dublin in 1996 and created Shelbourne Development, which focused primarily on core Dublin projects - redeveloping urban brownfield sites. Before the 2008 economic crash, Shelbourne was active in the London, Paris and Brussels. Kelleher is based mainly in Chicago and Los Angeles while dealing with claims for almost €47 million sought by National Asset Management Agency ('NAMA') back in Ireland.

Kelleher is also the non-executive director of Lightstream Pictures.<ref>. Lightstream Pictures Bios Retrieved on February 12, 2015.</ref>  Lightstream produced Max Rose, starring Jerry Lewis and Rampart'' with Woody Harrelson and has other projects in work.

Kelleher is the Executive Chairman of St. Patrick's Athletic, financing their 2013 SSE Airtricity and 2014 FAI Cup winning campaigns.

At the request of Mayor Daley, Garrett was involved with the Chicago’s 2016 bid for the Olympics.

In July 2006 Kelleher stepped in and bought a site at the intersection of the Chicago river and Lake Michigan after an earlier developer failed to close on the land. The  site would have housed the now-cancelled Chicago Spire. It would have been the tallest building in the US, and the world's tallest exclusively residential building. However, having started construction in 2007, his development company, Shelbourne Development Ltd, ran into financial difficulties during the global financial crisis and failed to secure further funding.  The project eventually collapsed causing large losses for Shelbourne's creditors and the site was signed over to a creditor as part of bankruptcy processing in 2014.

Kelleher sits on the Board of Regents at Ave Maria University in Florida. Opened in 2003 the University recognizes the importance of creating and maintaining an environment in which faith informs the life of the community. Kelleher also held the Chairmanship of Legatus in Ireland in 2006 which has  aims of "To study live and spread the Faith in our business, professional and personal lives".

Kelleher is a large shareholder in Dolmen Securities which was recently purchased by Cantor Fitzgerald. Kelleher sits on the Advisory Board of the US-Ireland Alliance.

Kelleher was involved in multiple lawsuits against NAMA including, in early 2018, launching a US$1.2 billion lawsuit via 60-page complaint lodged with the Federal District Court in Illinois, USA; alleging that the agency destroyed the developer's chances of building the Chicago Spire through a combination of "sheer spite" and "consistent incompetence" on the part of certain of its officials. The case was dismissed in 2019.

Personal life
Garrett is married to Maeve Kelleher, and they have seven children. Maeve is or has been on the board of some of Garrett Kelleher's companies. Between 2006 and 2014 she was a board member of Iona Institute.

References

Year of birth missing (living people)
Living people
Ave Maria University
Irish businesspeople in real estate
Businesspeople from Dublin (city)
California University of Pennsylvania alumni
People educated at Belvedere College